Hanako is a female Japanese given name. The name can have different meanings, one of them being 花子, meaning "flower girl."

It is often seen as an archetypal name for females.

華子 (華  is a kanji of many uses - 'splendor', 'flower', 'petal', 'shine', 'luster', 'ostentatious', 'showy'. 'ko' is the second kanji, meaning 'girl (child)').

People
Hanako Tsugaru, later Hanako, Princess Hitachi of Japan
Hanako Honda (1909–1968), Japanese politician
Hanako Miura (born 1975), Japanese gymnast
Hanako Muraoka (1893–1968), Japanese novelist and translator
Hanako Nakamori (born 1988), Japanese professional wrestler
Hanako Oku (born 1978), Japanese singer/songwriter
Hanako Oshima (born 1973), Japanese musician
Hanako Takigawa (born 1988), Japanese actress
Hanako Tokachi (1946–2016), Japanese actress
Hisa Ōta (1868–1945), Japanese actress whose stage name was "Hanako"

Other
Hanako (ハナコ) or Delia Ketchum, the mother of protagonist Ash Ketchum in the Pokémon anime
Hanako Ikezawa, a heroine with debilitating social anxiety derived from her burn scars from the visual novel Katawa Shoujo.
Hanako Ichiro, a Shiba Inu owned by Inuyashiki Ichiro, from the manga Inuyashiki by Hiroya Oku.
 Hanako-san, yokai in the girl toilet in Friday the 13th and Tuesday the 13th
Hanako Ohmuro, a character from YuruYuri
 Hanako (fish), a fish which lived to be more than 200 years old.
Hanako-kun (ghost), formerly Amane Yugi, the title character from the anime and manga series Toilet-Bound Hanako-kun
Hanako Yamada, a character of the video game Yandere Simulator

References

Japanese feminine given names